Marcelo Suárez-Orozco is the ninth permanent and current chancellor of the University of Massachusetts Boston,
 and is the first Latino to lead a campus in the Massachusetts public university system. He is the former inaugural UCLA Wasserman Dean at UCLA Graduate School of Education and Information Studies.

Pope Francis appointed Suárez-Orozco to the Executive Committee of Pontifical Academy of Social Sciences in January 2018.

Early life and education
Suárez-Orozco is a native of Buenos Aires, Argentina, and immigrated to the United States at age 17. After studying in community college, he earned his AB in psychology (1980), and a master’s (1981) and PhD in anthropology (1986) from the University of California, Berkeley.

Career

Suárez-Orozco served as a special adviser for education, peace, and justice to the chief prosecutor of the International Criminal Court in The Hague. 

He served as UCLA's Wasserman Dean of Education & Information Studies for eight years and raised an estimated $120 million in support of the school.

Suárez-Orozco served as the Victor S. Thomas Professor of Education at Harvard University, and co-founded the Harvard Immigration Project with his wife, Carola Suárez-Orozco. He served as the Courtney Sale Ross University Professor of Globalization and Education at New York University.

His research topics include psychological anthropology and cultural psychology, with a focus on globalization, education, and migration.

Chancellor at UMass Boston

Suárez-Orozco became chancellor of the University of Massachusetts Boston in August 2020, announcing initiatives to move the university toward "becoming a leading anti-racist and health promoting public research university."

He created the position of special assistant to the chancellor for Black life. In July 2020, Suárez-Orozco and his wife, Carola, established the George Floyd Honorary Scholarship Fund.

Honors
•	Member of the Executive Committee, Pontifical Academy of Social Sciences, The Vatican (Appointed by Pope Francis, June 2019)
•	Member of the Pontifical Academy of Social Sciences, The Vatican (Appointed by Pope Francis, January 2018)
•	Great Immigrant/Great American, The Carnegie Corporation of New York (Elected July 4, 2018).”
•	Member of the American Academy of Arts and Sciences (Elected April 2014). 
•	Orden Mexicana del Águila Azteca (The Mexican Order of the Aztec Eagle), 2006
•	Member of the National Academy of Education (Elected April 2004)

Books   

Suárez-Orozco has co-authored and edited books published by Harvard University Press, Stanford University Press, University of California Press, Cambridge University Press, New York University Press, and others.
His books include:

•	Central American Refugees and U.S. High Schools: A Psychosocial Study of Motivation and Achievement, 1989
•	Transformations: Immigration, Family Life, and Achievement Motivation Among Latino Adolescents, 1996
•	Crossings: Mexican Immigration in Interdisciplinary Perspectives, 1998
•	Children of Immigration, 2001 (The Developing Child)
•	Cultures under Siege: Collective Violence and Trauma, 2001
•	Latinos: Remaking America, 2002
•	Globalization: Culture and Education in the Millennium, 2004
•	The New Immigration: An Interdisciplinary Reader, 2005
•	Learning in the Global Era: International Perspectives on Globalization and Education, 2007
•	Learning a New Land: Immigrant Students in American Society, 2008 (Winner of the Stone Award for Best Book on Education)
•	Educating the Whole Child for the Whole World: The Ross School Model and Education for the Global Era, 2010
•	Writing Immigration: Scholars and Journalists in Dialogue, 2011
•	Global Migration, Diversity, and Civic Education: Improving Policy and Practice, 2016 (Multicultural Education Series)
•	Humanitarianism and Mass Migration: Confronting the World Crisis, 2019

References

External links
In an internal reckoning, UMass Boston taps administrator to oversee 'Black Life', Boston Globe 11.10.20
UMass Boston Fall Convocation 2020 09.26.20
Children of Immigrants: The American Promise, Rational Middle 09.20
Marcelo Suárez-Orozco — Scholar And Immigrant — Will Be UMass Boston's Next Leader, WBUR 2.10.20
New UMass Boston Chancellor Begins, NECN 9.4.20
Marcelo Suárez-Orozco appointed to Pontifical Academy of Social Sciences, UCLA Newsroom 2.12.18
Opinion: Like it or not, immigrant children are our future, Washington Post 9.20.18
Words Matter: Nasty, Donald Trump-style immigration rhetoric hurts children, US News 9.10.15
America’s First Latin American President?, US News 7.20.16
Marcelo Suárez-Orozco Named a “Great Immigrant” by the Carnegie Corporation, UCLA Graduate School of Education and Information Studies 7.18

Year of birth missing (living people)
Living people